Faiz Ahmed Faiz Express is a passenger train operated daily by Pakistan Railways between Lahore and Narowal. The train named after Faiz Ahmad Faiz, a famous Pakistani intellectual, revolutionary poet, and one of the most celebrated writers of the Urdu language,.

Route 
 Lahore Junction–Shahdara Bagh Junction via Karachi–Peshawar Railway Line
 Shahdara Bagh Junction–Narowal Junction via Shahdara Bagh–Chak Amru Branch Line

Station stops

Equipment 
The train has economy accommodations.

References 

Named passenger trains of Pakistan
Passenger trains in Pakistan